Nowa Wieś Legnicka  is a village in the administrative district of Gmina Legnickie Pole, within Legnica County, Lower Silesian Voivodeship, in south-western Poland.

The village has a population of 560.

External links 
 Nowa Wieś Legnicka - Neudorf b. Liegnitz na portalu polska-org.pl

References

Villages in Legnica County